"I'm So Happy I Can't Stop Crying" is a song written and recorded by English rock singer Sting, which featured on his fifth album, Mercury Falling (1996). The song was also released as a single, and reached No.94 in the US. Sting also recorded the song as a duet with American country music artist Toby Keith for Keith's 1997 album Dream Walkin'; this version reached No.2 in the US Hot Country Songs charts and No.84 in the US Billboard Hot 100 charts, giving Sting his only country hit.

Background and release
Sting began composing the song as a rock song, but the lyrical content pushed the song in a country direction, and it evolved into a country-rock shuffle. The song begins in the key of E-flat major, before modulating a semitone upward to E major in the final verse. Its lyrics concern a father whose wife has left him for another man and taken their two children. After a cynical beginning, he has a revelation about the connectedness of life and the universe, and finishes the song truly 'so happy he can't stop crying'. The music video for the song was directed by Lol Creme.

During the Mercury Falling tour, Sting would often invite audience members up onto stage to sing the song along with him.

Critical reception
Larry Flick from Billboard described the song as "a country-flavored ballad that shows the artist at his most tender and engaging." He added, "It's kind of odd at first to hear Sting's reedy tenor amid the twang of a slide guitar, but it ultimately works."

Track listing
 US edition
"I'm So Happy I Can't Stop Crying"
"This Was Never Meant to Be"
"Giacomo's Blues"
"Beneath a Desert Moon"

 German edition
"I'm So Happy I Can't Stop Crying"
"Moonlight"
"La Belle Dame Sans Regrets"

Charts

Toby Keith version

In 1997, American country music singer Toby Keith recorded the song for his fourth studio album, Dream Walkin' (1997). His version, a duet with Sting, was released in late 1997 as the album's second single. It out-peaked the original version on the Billboard Hot 100, peaking at No.84. It reached No.2 on the Hot Country Singles & Tracks (now Hot Country Songs) charts, becoming Sting's only entry on that chart. Additionally, it was nominated for a Grammy Award for Best Country Collaboration With Vocals.

Background
According to Keith, Sting agreed to let Keith record the song to give it a second chance at radio, as long as Sting could play bass guitar and sing duet vocals on it. The two also performed the song at the 1997 Country Music Association awards.

Critical reception
Deborah Evans Price, of Billboard magazine reviewed the song favorably, saying that Sting and Keith's voices "complement each other extremely well." She goes on to say that a great songwriter can write words and music that transcend any genre and Sting's "poignant lyrics and strong melody on this song are perfect evidence."

Charts
"I'm So Happy I Can't Stop Crying" debuted at number 53 on the Hot Country Singles & Tracks chart for the week of 11October 1997.

References

1996 singles
1997 singles
Sting (musician) songs
Toby Keith songs
Male vocal duets
Songs written by Sting (musician)
Song recordings produced by James Stroud
A&M Records singles
Mercury Nashville singles
1996 songs
Song recordings produced by Hugh Padgham